The 105-Man Incident (Hangul: 105인 사건; Hanja: 百五人事件; RR: Baego-in Sageon) or Seoncheon Incident (Hangul: 선천사건; Hanja: 宣川事件; RR: Seoncheon Sageon) took place while Korea was under Japanese rule.

In 1911, apparently as a result of several Korean attempts in 1910 to assassinate Terauchi Masatake, the Governor-General of Korea (Chōsen Sōtoku) arrested over 700 Koreans, many of whom were Christian. In 1912, the Governor-General sent 122 of those arrested to the Court of Justice, and 105 of them were sentenced to imprisonment with hard labor. In the end, only six Koreans had their sentences imposed, but even they were released in 1915 after being granted amnesty.

Details
The incident began in Sensen, a coastal town in Heian-hoku Prefecture. On December 28, 1910, the American missionary George McCune met with Terauchi. The Japanese claimed it was an assassination attempt and arrested over 700 Koreans starting in October 1911. Lead Christian members of Sinminhoe (a Korean independence movement) were specifically targeted in the arrests, and as a result, the organization was dissolved. In particular, notable activists Kim Gu, Cha Yi-seok, and Yang Jeon-baek were imprisoned. A trial of 123 defendants held on June 28, 1912, took place without evidence and confessions were extracted under torture. 105 were found to be guilty of treason and sentenced to forced labor.

Western View
Initially, westerners were accepting of the incident as they had a favorable view of the Japanese and thought it might be necessary in the time of change. However, when the missionaries began feeling victimized, they distanced themselves from the Japanese government and outside pressure finally forced them to grant amnesty to the prisoners in 1915.

See also
 An Chang-ho
 Yang Gi-tak
 Yun Chi-ho
 Lim Chi Jung
 Kim Gu
 Syngman Rhee
 Lee Donghui
 Masatake Terauchi

References

External links
 105인 사건 
 '105인 사건'을 재조명한다 The DongahIlbo 2011.11.02 
 [Editorial] Independence movement scholars should be reinstated Hangyorye Feb.13,2012 
 ‘105인 사건’은 한국교회 향한 대박해 사건 아이굿뉴스

1911 in Korea
Korean independence movement
Anti-Japanese sentiment in Korea
Yun Chi-ho
Korea under Japanese rule
History of North Pyongan Province